Masai is an area in Pasir Gudang, Johor Bahru District, Johor, Malaysia, and is the oldest neighbourhood of Johor Bahru town. It is located 25 kilometres from the Johor Bahru city centre. Masai is located on route J10 which leads to Kong Kong, a fishing village along Johor River. The main access roads to Masai are Jalan Masai Lama (J10) and Pasir Gudang Highway (Federal Route 17).

Many pre-war buildings are still well preserved. Masai, like many of the towns in the Johor Bahru district, catered to the rural population of farmers and rubber plantation workers throughout the early and mid 20th century.

History
Masai has gone through vigorous development which has transformed the town into one of the most populous towns in Johor. The Masai Chinese Primary School now has more than 5000 pupils. Shops include Today's, Yos Saver Store, Kip-Mart and Tesco.

Bandar Seri Alam is the business centre for Masai, with Maybank, Public Bank, Bank Simpanan Nasional and Bank Rakyat and hotels.

The Masai Main Street, Jalan Masai Lama, is the main road connecting Johor Bahru to towns at the east side of Masai such as Kota Masai, Kong Kong and Pasir Gudang.

Meanwhile, Masai is also the name of the district, Masai District with post code of 81750, where the town is situated. Masai district is consist of Masai town, Bandar Seri Alam, Taman Rinting, Kota Puteri, Plentong, Permas Jaya and others. Due to location, Tanjung Langsat industrial area is quite near to Pasir Gudang, so it's categorized as Pasir Gudang district. However, the weird thing for Tanjung Langsat village is that the village is categorized as Masai district due to historical development.

Education

Primary school
 SK Masai
 SJK (C) Masai（马赛华小）
 SJK (C) Chien Chi, Plentong（建集华小）
 SJK (C) Chee Tong（启东华小）
 SJK (C) Nam Heng Baru（南兴华小）
 SJK (T) Masai
 SK Senibong
 SK Cahaya Baru
 SK Kongkong Laut
 SK Tanjong Langsat
 SK Taman Rinting 1
 SK Permas Jaya 1
 SK Permas Jaya 2
 SK Taman Permas Jaya 3
 SK Permas Jaya 5 
 SK Seri Kota Puteri
 SK Perigi Acheh
 SK Bandar Seri Alam
 SK Seri Alam 2
 SK Seri Kota Puteri 4
 SK Taman Megah Ria

Secondary school
 Foon Yew High School - Masai
 SMK Dato' Penggawa Timur（拿督彭嘉华国中）
 SMK Seri Kota Puteri
 SMK Bandar Seri Alam（至达城国中）
 SMK Seri Alam 2
 SMK Taman Rinting 2 （长春国中二校）
 SMK Permas Jaya
 SMK Permas Jaya 2
 SMK Permas Jaya 3
 MRSM Johor Bahru
 Sekolah Seni Malaysia Johor Bahru

Higher Education
 UITM Pasir Gudang
 UniKL Pasir Gudang

Transportation
The suburb houses the Masai Terminal. The area is accessible by Muafakat Bus route P-301 and P-303.

References

Pasir Gudang
Towns and suburbs in Johor Bahru District